
Cantabrigian  (often shortened to Cantab) is an adjective that is used in two meanings: 1) to refer to what is of or pertaining to Cambridge University, located in Cambridge, United Kingdom; or 2) to refer to what is of or pertaining to the cities of Cambridge, United Kingdom and Cambridge, United States. The term is derived from Cantabrigia, a medieval Latin name for Cambridge invented on the basis of the Anglo-Saxon name Cantebrigge.

In Cambridge, United States, the name "Cantabrigia" appears in the city seal and (abbreviated to "Cantab") in the seal of the Episcopal Divinity School, located therein. The word Cantabrigia appears in the circular logo of the Cambridge Trust Company, a financial institution based in Cambridge, United States. A pub in Cambridge, United States, called the Cantab Lounge is a play on this abbreviation.

It is also the name of one of the Rugby clubs based in Cambridge, United Kingdom. Cantabrigian Rugby Club formerly The Old Cantabrigian RUFC, was established by the 'old boys' of local Hills Road Sixth Form College (formerly The Cambridgeshire High School for Boys, until 1974). Cantabrigian Rowing Club was similarly established, in 1950.

See also 
 The Tab, a student newspaper group originating in Cambridge
 List of University of Cambridge members

Notes

References 
Chambers English Dictionary, Cambridge University Press, 1988.

External links
 

Culture in Cambridge
Terminology of the University of Cambridge